Treasure Island is a 1934 film directed by Victor Fleming and starring Wallace Beery, Jackie Cooper, Lionel Barrymore, Lewis Stone, and Nigel Bruce. It is an adaptation of Robert Louis Stevenson's famous 1883 novel of the same name. Jim Hawkins discovers a treasure map and travels on a sailing ship to a remote island, but pirates led by Long John Silver threaten to take away the honest seafarers’ riches and lives.

Plot

Young Jim Hawkins (Jackie Cooper) and his mother (Dorothy Peterson) run the Admiral Benbow, a tavern near Bristol, England. One dark and stormy night, during a birthday celebration, the mysterious Billy Bones (Lionel Barrymore) arrives and drunkenly talks about treasure. Soon after, Bones is visited by Black Dog (Charles McNaughton) then Pew (William V. Mong), and drops dead, leaving a chest, which he bragged contained gold and jewels. Instead of money, Jim finds a map that his friend Dr. Livesey (Otto Kruger) realizes will lead them to the famous Flint treasure. Squire Trelawney (Nigel Bruce) raises money for a voyage to the treasure island and they set sail on Captain Alexander Smollett's (Lewis Stone) ship Hispaniola. Also on board is the one-legged Long John Silver (Wallace Beery) and his cronies. Even though Bones had warned Jim about a sailor with one leg, they become friends.

During the voyage, several fatal "accidents" happen to sailors who disapprove of Silver and his cohorts. Then, the night before landing on the island, Jim overhears Silver plotting to take the treasure and kill Smollett's men. Jim goes ashore with the men, and encounters an old hermit named Ben Gunn (Chic Sale), who tells him that he has found Flint's treasure. Meanwhile, Smollett  and his loyal men flee to Flint's stockade on the island for safety. Silver's men then attack the stockade when Smollett refuses to give them the treasure map. While the situation looks hopeless, Jim secretly goes back to the Hispaniola at night, sails it to a safe location and shoots one of the pirates in self-defense. When he returns to the stockade, Silver's men are there and Silver tells them that a treaty has been signed. The pirates want to kill Jim, but Silver protects him. Dr. Livesey comes for Jim, but the boy refuses to break his word to Silver not to run away. The next day the pirates search for the treasure hold and when they find it, it is empty. When some of the pirates mutiny against Silver, Livesey and Gunn join him in the fight. Smollett then sails home with the treasure, which Gunn had hidden in his cave, and with Silver as his prisoner. Silver tells Jim a horror story of a slow death by hanging due to his one leg causing Jim to be unable to stand by and let his friend be hanged, Jim frees Silver. As he sails away, Silver promises to hunt treasure with Jim again some day, as Honest John Silver.

Cast
 Wallace Beery as Long John Silver
 Jackie Cooper as Jim Hawkins
 Lionel Barrymore as Billy Bones
 Otto Kruger as Doctor Livesey
 Lewis Stone as Captain Smollett
 Nigel Bruce as Squire Trelawney
 Charles "Chic" Sale as Ben Gunn
 William V. Mong as Pew
 Charles McNaughton as Black Dog
 Dorothy Peterson as Mrs. Hawkins
 Vernon Downing as Inn Boy
 As Pirates of the Spanish Main:
 Douglass Dumbrille (Israel Hands)
 Edmund Breese (Job Anderson)
 Olin Howland (Dick)
 Charles Irwin (Abraham Gray)
 Edward Pawley (William O'Brien)
 Richard Powell (Post)
 James Burke (George Merry)
 John Anderson (Harry Sykes)
 Charles Bennett (Daddy Dawson)
 Harry Cording as Henry (uncredited)
 J. M. Kerrigan as Tom Morgan (uncredited)

Casting notes
Wallace Beery originally was cast as Israel Hands in director Maurice Tourneur's silent production of Treasure Island for Paramount in 1920 (now a lost film). Beery was replaced by Joseph Singleton but appeared that year in Tourneur's silent masterpiece The Last of the Mohicans.

Reception
The film's box office performance was described as "disappointing" although it was MGM's third biggest film of the season with rentals of $2,264,000.  It was re-issued in 1937–38 and earned an additional $144,000.

Writing for The Spectator in 1936, Graham Greene favorably compared the film to Midshipman Easy, describing Treasure Island as having "a deeper, a more poetic value", with characters and events providing rich symbolism and a palpable sense of good and evil.

References

External links
 
 
 
 
 Treasure Island at Rotten Tomatoes
 Radio Times review

1934 films
Metro-Goldwyn-Mayer films
1934 adventure films
Films directed by Victor Fleming
American black-and-white films
1930s English-language films
Treasure Island films
Films scored by Herbert Stothart
American adventure films
1930s American films